Praises to the King is reggae - dancehall's artist Capleton, eleventh studio album. It was released on January 1, 2003. The album features guest appearances from Gentleman, Luciano, Bobbi Zarro  and Josie Mel.

Track listing

	

2000 albums
Capleton albums